The Elizabethan Strangers, often referred to as just the Strangers, were a group of Protestant refugees seeking political asylum from the Catholic Low Countries, who settled in and around Norwich. The first group came from Flanders in 1565, but many more followed, eventually making up a third of the population of Norwich.

First settlers

In 1565,  City authorities invited Protestant refugees from the Spanish Netherlands to settle in Norwich to boost the City's textile industry. 30 households of master weavers, totalling almost 300 people, journeyed from the Low Countries to Norwich seeking refuge from religious persecution. They were the first of the "Elizabethan Strangers".

See also
Strangers' Hall
Norwich

External links
Norfolk Museums & Archaeology Service - Strangers' Hall

References

Protestant denominations established in the 16th century